Butkevičius is a Lithuanian surname. It may refer to:

Algirdas Butkevičius, Lithuanian politician
Audrius Butkevičius, Lithuanian politician

See also
Butkus

Lithuanian-language surnames